Europe's Biggest Dance Show 2020 was the second and third editions of Europe's Biggest Dance Show, a multinational dance music simulcast presented by Euroradio and hosted by BBC Radio 1, in collaboration with nine other radio stations from across Europe: 1LIVE, Fritz, Mouv', NPO 3FM, RTÉ 2FM, Studio Brussel, SR P3, and for the first time, NRK mP3 and YleX.

Background 
Despite the 2019 edition being billed as a one-off event, the British Broadcasting Corporation (BBC) announced on 17 April 2020 that Europe's Biggest Dance Show would return on 8 May.

The BBC subsequently announced on 27 September that the simulcast would return for a third edition on 23 October.

Running order

May 2020 
The simulcast started at 19:00 BST on 8 May and finished at 02:00 BST on 9 May, with Annie Mac introducing for BBC Radio 1 in London. As was the case in 2019, eight radio stations from seven countries contributed one hour of dance music from their respective country, with the exception of 1LIVE and Fritz, who contributed 30 minutes each from Cologne and Berlin respectively.

Some stations chose to feature at least one live DJ set as part of their contribution e.g., Rebecca & Fiona for SR P3.

Each radio station sent their feeds to Broadcasting House in London, where they were mixed by BBC senior technical producer Dan Morris before being sent back to the radio stations for broadcast.

October 2020 
The simulcast started at 18:00 BST on 23 October and finished at 02:00 BST on 24 October, with Annie Mac introducing for BBC Radio 1 in London. As was the case in May, each radio station contributed an hour of dance music from their respective country, except in the case of 1LIVE and Fritz, who broadcast 30 minutes each from Cologne and Berlin respectively.

Having contributed to the 2019 and May 2020 editions, Mouv' did not contribute, while NRK mP3 and YleX contributed for the first time. FM4 broadcast the simulcast in Austria as part of its weekly dance music show La boum de luxe.

Each radio station sent their feeds to Broadcasting House in London, which were mixed by BBC senior technical producer Dan Morris, before being sent back to the radio stations for broadcast.

See also 
 Europe's Biggest Dance Show 2019
 Europe's Biggest Dance Show 2021
 Europe's Biggest Dance Show 2022
 BBC Radio 1
 European Broadcasting Union

References 

BBC Radio 1 programmes
British music radio programmes
RTÉ 2fm programmes
Sveriges Radio programmes